The Survey of Palestine was a two volume survey of Mandatory Palestine prepared between December 1945 and March 1946, as evidence for the Anglo-American Committee of Inquiry. A supplement was published in June 1947.

Bibliography

References

External links
 A Survey of Palestine Volume I 
 A Survey of Palestine Volume II

Arab–Israeli conflict
Documents of Mandatory Palestine
1946 non-fiction books